The Yemen linnet (Linaria yemenensis) is a species of finch in the family Fringillidae. It is found in Saudi Arabia and Yemen. Its natural habitat is subtropical or tropical dry shrubland.

The Yemen linnet was formerly placed in the genus Carduelis but was moved to the genus Linaria based on a phylogenetic analysis of mitochondrial and nuclear DNA sequences.

References

Birds described in 1913
Linaria (bird)
Taxa named by William Robert Ogilvie-Grant
Taxonomy articles created by Polbot